Maria Sharapova defeated the two-time defending champion Serena Williams in the final, 6–1, 6–4 to win the ladies' singles tennis title at the 2004 Wimbledon Championships. It was her first major title. The 17-year-old's victory over the six-time major champion was described by commentators as "the most stunning upset in memory". With the win, Sharapova entered the top 10 in rankings for the first time in her career. She became the third-youngest woman to win Wimbledon (behind Lottie Dod and Martina Hingis) and the second Russian woman to win a major title (after Anastasia Myskina won that year's French Open).

Serena Williams was attempting to become the first woman to win the title three consecutive times since Steffi Graf in 1991, 1992 and 1993.

This was the last major singles tournament for former world No. 1 Martina Navratilova. Awarded a wild card, she won her first round match and became, at age 47, the oldest player in the Open Era to win a main draw match at Wimbledon and the second-lowest ranked player to do so (world No. 1,001, behind Barbara Schwartz who was unranked in 2001).

Seeds

  Serena Williams (final)
  Anastasia Myskina (third round)
  Venus Williams (second round)
  Amélie Mauresmo (semifinals)
  Lindsay Davenport (semifinals)
  Elena Dementieva (first round)
  Jennifer Capriati (quarterfinals)
  Svetlana Kuznetsova (first round)
  Paola Suárez (quarterfinals)
  Nadia Petrova (fourth round)
  Ai Sugiyama (quarterfinals)
  Vera Zvonareva (fourth round)
  Maria Sharapova (champion)
  Silvia Farina Elia (fourth round)
  Patty Schnyder (second round)
  Anna Smashnova-Pistolesi (first round)

  Chanda Rubin (first round)
  Francesca Schiavone (second round)
  Fabiola Zuluaga (first round)
  Elena Bovina (second round)
  Magdalena Maleeva (fourth round)
  Conchita Martínez (first round)
  Jelena Dokić (first round)
  Mary Pierce (first round)
  Nathalie Dechy (third round)
  Lisa Raymond (second round)
  Alicia Molik (third round)
  Émilie Loit (first round)
  Dinara Safina (first round)
  Eleni Daniilidou (first round)
  Amy Frazier (fourth round)
  Meghann Shaughnessy (third round)

Qualifying

Draw

Finals

Top half

Section 1

Section 2

Section 3

Section 4

Bottom half

Section 5

Section 6

Section 7

Section 8

Championship match statistics

References

External links

2004 Wimbledon Championships on WTAtennis.com
2004 Wimbledon Championships – Women's draws and results at the International Tennis Federation

Women's Singles
Wimbledon Championship by year – Women's singles
Wimbledon Championships
Wimbledon Championships